Curling was included in the program of the inaugural Winter Olympic Games in 1924 in Chamonix although the results of that competition were not considered official by the International Olympic Committee until 2006. Curling was a demonstration sport at the 1932 Games, and then again after a lengthy absence in 1988 and 1992. The sport was finally added to the official program for the Nagano 1998.

Until 2018, only men's and women's events were contested. An additional event, mixed doubles, was rejected for 2010 because the Olympic Programme Commission felt it had not developed enough, but was approved for the 2018 Winter Olympics at an IOC Executive Board meeting in June 2015.

Since the 1998 Olympics, Canada has generally dominated the sport with their men's teams winning gold in 2006, 2010, and 2014, and silver in 1998 and 2002, and a bronze in 2022. The women's team won gold in 1998 and 2014, a silver in 2010, and a bronze in 2002 and 2006. Their mixed doubles team won gold in 2018.

The related ice stock sport (Eisstockschießen in German) was a demonstration event in 1936 and 1964. These events are not considered additional demonstrations of curling.

Summary

Events
• = official event, (d) = demonstration event

Participating nations
The final placement for each team in each tournament is shown in the following tables.

Men's tournament

Note: The three medal winners in 1924 were the only teams entered that year.

Women's tournament

Mixed doubles tournament

Medal table

Sources (after the 2022 Winter Olympics):
Accurate as of 2022 Winter Olympics.

Medal summary

Men

Women

Mixed doubles

See also
 List of Olympic venues in curling
 Wheelchair curling at the Winter Paralympics
 Ice stock sport at the Winter Olympics, a similar sport
 Curling at the Youth Olympic Games

References

External links

 Olympic information at the World Curling Federation's site

Curling at the Winter Olympics
Sports at the Winter Olympics
Olympics